Gökskulla is a residential area in Tahult, Landvetter in Härryda Municipality in Sweden. Television presenter Clara Henry was born here.

References

Populated places in Härryda Municipality